The Battle of Cetate was fought during the Crimean War. In this battle a large Ottoman force under Ahmed Pasha unsuccessfully attempted to capture the village of Cetate which was controlled by Russian Colonel .

Background
The battle took place during the Danube campaign of the Crimean War. In the build-up to the war, Russia occupied the Danubian Principalities of Moldavia and Wallachia, positioning troops on the left (northern) bank of the Danube, which formed the border with Ottoman territory. The Ottoman Empire had responded by moving troops to the right bank to face them.

In the west, on the border with Austria and Serbia, Russian troops in Cetate were faced by Ottoman forces in the fortress of Vidin.

Following the Ottoman ultimatum on 4 October 1853 to withdraw within 2 weeks, Ottoman forces under Ahmed Pasha crossed the river and occupied the town of Calafat, which they fortified as a bridgehead.

Battle
On 31 December 1853 Ahmed Pasha and a force of several thousand cavalry, supported by infantry, advanced to attack Cetate, which was held by a Russian detachment, under Colonel Alexander K. Baumgarten. This attack was repulsed, after which both sides called up reinforcements.

On 6 January 1854 (Christmas Day in the Russian Orthodox calendar), Ahmed renewed his assault with a force of 18,000 men. The Russians repelled several attacks but were running out of shells and losing a significant number of the troops. However, Russian reinforcements arrived during the day, and Ahmed, fearing an assault on his base and being cut off himself, abandoned the town and retreated to Calafat.

Aftermath
The battle at Cetate was ultimately indecisive. After heavy casualties on both sides, both armies were back at their start positions. The Ottoman forces were still in a strong position and barring contact between the Russians and the Serbs, to whom they looked for support, but were themselves no nearer driving the Russians from the Principalities, their stated aim.

Gallery

References

Bibliography

See also
 Battle of Oltenița

Cetate
Cetate
Military history of Romania
History of Dolj County
Cetate
1853 in Romania
1854 in Romania
December 1853 events
January 1854 events